The UCLA Bruins women's gymnastics team represents the University of California, Los Angeles and competes in the Pac-12 Conference. They currently compete in Pauley Pavilion, Los Angeles, CA. The team, coached by Janelle McDonald, has won 21 Regional titles and 7 NCAA National Championships, most recently in 2018.

The Bruins are known for recruiting top elite gymnasts from North America and beyond, including Austria, Germany, Guatemala, and Ireland. Some notable former and current UCLA gymnasts include U.S. Assistant Secretary of State for Public Affairs Michelle Giuda, psychologist Onnie Willis Rogers, stuntwoman Heidi Moneymaker, and Olympic gymnasts Jamie Dantzscher, Mohini Bhardwaj, Kate Richardson, Tasha Schwikert, Kristen Maloney, Yvonne Tousek, Stella Umeh, Luisa Portocarrero, Elyse Hopfner-Hibbs, Sam Peszek, Peng Peng Lee, Jennifer Pinches, Jordyn Wieber (former Bruins team manager and volunteer assistant coach), Kyla Ross, Madison Kocian, Brooklyn Moors, and Jordan Chiles.

Highlights
1997, 2000, 2001, 2003, 2004: Won national championship.
2008 Canadian Olympic Gymnastics team member Elyse Hopfner-Hibbs attended UCLA, a member of the team in 2008–2009 season.
2009: The Bruins won the 2009 Pac-10 title, their 14th, and was 7th seeded in the NCAA National Championships. They competed at the NCAA North Central Regionals at Carver-Hawkeye Arena on Saturday, Apr. 4 with Florida (#6), Minnesota (#18), Denver (#20), Iowa State (#23) and Iowa (#28). The Bruins came in second behind Florida. In the second session of the national championships, the Bruins finished tie for third place with Utah. But Utah won the tie breakers by counting all the scores of the six competitors in each event and advanced to the Super Six team finals.
2010: The team won its 15th Pacific-10 Championship, with Anna Li scoring a perfect 10 on uneven bars. Vanessa Zamarripa won all-around and vault, and was named 2010 Pac-10 Gymnast Of The Year.
2010: UCLA Gymnastics won the Los Angeles Regional and qualified for the NCAA Championships in Gainesville, Florida. Anna Li again scored a perfect 10 on the uneven bars at Pauley Pavilion, where both of her parents, Li Yuejiu and Wu Jiani won medals at the 1984 Olympic Games.
2010: USA Olympic team silver medalist Samantha Peszek is attending UCLA, and is a new member of the 2011 UCLA gymnastics team.
2010: The team won its sixth NCAA title at the O'Connell Center in Gainesville, FL.
2011: UCLA finished second in the national competition; Athens Regional champions; Samantha Peszek was first in balance beam with a 9.90 score.
2012: Third-place finish in team competition; Olivia Courtney was third in uneven bars, and Elyse Hopfner-Hibbs was second in floor exercise.
2013: UCLA was 4th in the team competition held at its own Pauley Pavilion; Four Bruins finished as top-eight performers in individual competition, three (Olivia Courtney, Kaelie Baer, and Vanessa Zamarripa) on vault and one (Danusia Francis) on beam.
2014: UCLA did not qualify to Saturday night's Super Six competition in Birmingham, AL. Two Bruins competed on Sunday in event finals, Samantha Peszek and Olivia Courtney.
2015: UCLA captured the team's 21st Regional Championship with a score of 197.500 points at the NCAA Columbus Regional. Samantha Peszek was the All Around Co-Champion with 39.6 points; Samantha Peszek also won the balance beam with a 9.950 score.
 2016: UCLA finished second at the Salt Lake City Regional, held at the University of Utah's Jon M. Huntsman Center with a score of 196.375. The Bruins advanced to the NCAA Gymnastics Championships for the 32nd time, assigned to the Semifinal II. Seniors Danusia Francis and Sadiqua Bynum and junior Angi Cipra were awarded regular season All-America honors by the National Association of College Gymnastics Coaches (NACGC/W).
 2017: UCLA finished 4th at the NCAA Super Six Finals. Freshman Kyla Ross won both the balance beam and the uneven bars titles; she also received four perfect 10.0 scores throughout the season. Freshman Madison Kocian also scored a perfect 10.0 on February 11.
 2018: UCLA won their seventh NCAA title in St Louis. Peng Peng Lee and Katelyn Ohashi also won individual titles on the balance beam and floor exercise, respectively.
 2019: Coach Valorie Kondos Field will retire from coaching. An attendance record of 12,907 at Pauley Pavilion was set during a meet with Stanford on March 10, 2019. Senior Katelyn Ohashi set a Pac-12 record by winning the conference's Specialist of the Week award for the sixth time and her 10th career award this season. Kyla Ross completed a "gym slam" on March 17, 2019, at Miss Val's final home meet in Pauley Pavilion by recording a perfect 10 score on the floor exercise. UCLA won the Pac-12 championship with a score of 198.4, setting a new Pac-12 Gymnastics Championship record. Kyla Ross was the Pac-12 Gymnast of the Year, and Valorie Kondos Field was the Coach of the Year (her fifth Pac-12 honor).
2020: On January 31, senior Gracie Kramer became the first of two gymnasts to score a perfect 10 on the floor exercise during the season; her routine garnered millions of views online. On February 23, senior Grace Glenn scored the first leadoff 10.0 on the balance beam in NCAA history; junior Nia Dennis' floor routine from the same meet went viral on Twitter and Facebook, leading to her appearance on the Ellen Show on March 11. Kyla Ross scored three 10.0 scores during the season, two on bars and the other on the last vault of her career; this brought her career total to 22 perfect scores, tied 4th with Maggie Nichols in NCAA history. On March 12, the NCAA cancelled the remainder of the season due to the COVID-19 pandemic in the United States The team finished the season ranked third, with an RQS of 197.565 after the tenth week of competition.
2023: Received a share of the Pac-12 regular season title, along with Utah, Oregon State, and Cal.

Championships

Super Six appearances

Four on the Floor appearances

Coaches

Head coaches 

 record includes invitationals and conference championships as of 2021.

Coaches for the 2022–2023 season

Current roster

Future recruits 
Gymnasts who have committed to UCLA.

2023–2024 commits 
 Sydney Barros – 2019 Junior World bronze medalist (team)
 Katelyn Rosen

NCAA Championships

With the titles in 2018, UCLA now has 40 NCAA individual titles and 7 team titles:

Awards and honors
Honda Award Winners
 Kyla Ross, 2020
 Christine Peng-Peng Lee, 2018
 Kristen Maloney, 2005
 Onnie Willis, 2003 
 Mohini Bhardwaj, 2001
 Jill Andrews, 1990
 Sharon Shapiro, 1981
AAI Award (National Senior of the Year)
 Vanessa Zamarripa, 2013
 Jamie Dantzscher, 2004
 Mohini Bhardwaj, 2001
 Donna Kemp, 1984
Pac-12 Gymnast of the Year
 Kyla Ross, 2019 & 2020
 Vanessa Zamarripa, 2010 & 2013
 Tasha Schwikert, 2007
 Kate Richardson, 2006
 Kristen Maloney, 2005
 Jeanette Antolin, 2004
 Onnie Willis, 2003
 Jamie Dantzscher, 2002
 Mohini Bhardwaj, 2001
 Heidi Moneymaker, 2000
 Kiralee Hayashi, 1999
 Stella Umeh, 1998
 Leah Homma, 1995 & 1997
 Jill Andrews, 1988 & 1990
 Tanya Service, 1987 & 1989

Pac-12 Freshman/Newcomer of the Year
 Chae Campbell, 2021
 Kyla Ross, 2017 
 Olivia Courtney, 2011
 Elyse Hopfner-Hibbs, 2009
 Brittani McCullough, 2008
 Ariana Berlin, 2006
 Tasha Schwikert, 2005
 Kate Richardson, 2003
 Doni Thompson, 2000

Pac-12 Specialist of the Year
 Katelyn Ohashi, 2018 & 2019
 Christine Peng-Peng Lee, 2017

Pac-12 Scholar-Athletes of the Year
 Pauline Tratz, 2021
 Madison Kocian, 2020
 Christine Peng-Peng Lee, 2018

National Coach of the Year
 Valorie Kondos Field, 2001, 2000, 1997, 1996, 1989
 Jerry Tomlinson, 1989

National Asst. Coach of the Year
 Chris Waller, 2004
 Randy Lane, 2000

Past Olympians 
 Gigi Zosa  (1984)
 Rhonda Faehn (1988 alternate)
 Luisa Portocarrero  (1992)
 Stella Umeh  (1992)
 Yvonne Tousek  (1996, 2000)
 Michelle Conway  (2000)
 Jamie Dantzscher (2000) 
 Kristen Maloney (2000) 
 Kate Richardson  (2000, 2004)
 Tasha Schwikert (2000, 2004 alternate) 
 Alyssa Beckerman (2000 alternate)
 Mohini Bhardwaj (2004) 
 Samantha Peszek (2008) 
 Elyse Hopfner-Hibbs  (2008)
 Kyla Ross (2012) 
 Jennifer Pinches  (2012)
 Peng-Peng Lee  (2012 honorary captain)
 Anna Li (2012 alternate)
 Madison Kocian (2016)  
 Pauline Tratz  (2016 alternate)
 Danusia Francis  (2020)
 Jordan Chiles (2020) 
 Brooklyn Moors  (2020)
 Emma Malabuyo (2020 alternate)

Men's gymnastics team
The Bruins men's gymnastics team won two NCAA national champions in 1984 and 1987. The program was discontinued during university budget cuts in 1995 despite a record of athletic and academic success.

Notable alumni of UCLA men's gymnastics include:
 Tim Daggett, 1984 Olympic gold medallist
 Mitch Gaylord, 1984 NCAA all-around champion & Olympic gold medallist
 Brian Ginsberg, two-time US junior national gymnastics champion
 Scott Keswick, 1992 US Olympian and world rings and high bar finalist
 Stephen McCain, 2000 US Olympian and 2001 world silver medallist
 Chainey Umphrey, 1996 US Olympian and world high bar finalist
 Peter Vidmar, 1982, 1983 NCAA all-around champion & 1984 2x Olympic gold medallist
 Chris Waller, 1990 NCAA high bar champion and previous women's team head coach (2020-2022)
 Freddy Behin, 1995, 1996, 1997 Finalist USA National Championships, 1996 World Championship

See also 
UCLA Bruins
NCAA Women's Gymnastics Championships
Former and current UCLA gymnasts

References

External links